Khudgarz is a 2017 Pakistani television family drama series aired on ARY Digital from December 2017 to April 2018. It is produced by Humayun Saeed, Shahzad Nasib, Sana Shahnawaz and Samina Humayun Saeed under Six Sigma Plus and Next Level Entertainment. It stars Aamina Sheikh, Syed Jibran and Sami Khan in lead roles.

 
The serial released on ARY Digital.

Cast
Aamina Sheikh as Ayrea
Sami Khan as Hassan
Syed Jibran as Junaid
Mansha Pasha as Abeer
Seemi Pasha as Abeer's mother
Mehmood Akhtar as Ayrea's father
Shaheen Khan as Hassan's mother
Ghulam Mohiuddin as Hassan's father
Salman Saeed as Raheel
Rayyan Ibrahim
Kiran Ashfaq
Khwaja Shadab
Parveen Soomro
Tehseen Tasneem
Azam Khan

Accoldaes

References

External links

2017 Pakistani television series debuts
Urdu-language television shows
ARY Digital original programming